Barachois station was a staffed Via Rail in Barachois, Quebec, Canada. Located on Route 132, it served the Montreal – Gaspé train before Via Rail suspended service east of Matapedia in August 2013 due to poor track condition. Via lists the station as a "sign post", a station closed permanently with no ticket agent.

See also
 Barachois

References

External links

Via Rail stations in Quebec
Railway stations in Gaspésie–Îles-de-la-Madeleine
Disused railway stations in Canada